The Fires Prevention Act 1785 or the Fires Prevention (Metropolis) Act 1785 (25 Geo 3 c 77) was an Act of the Parliament of Great Britain.

This Act was partly repealed by section 2 of the Limitations of Actions and Costs Act 1842 (5 & 6 Vict c 97).

The whole Act, so far as unrepealed, was repealed by section 13(2) of, and Part I of Schedule 4 to, the Criminal Law Act 1967.

Title
The title from "and for indemnifying" to the end of the title was repealed by section 1 of, and the Schedule to, the Statute Law Revision Act 1887.

Preamble
The preamble was repealed by section 1 of, and the Schedule to, the Statute Law Revision Act 1887.

Section 1
This section from the beginning of the section to "repealed and that", and from "of debt" to "information" and from "at Westminster" to "allowed" was repealed by section 1 of, and the Schedule to, the Statute Law Revision Act 1887.

In this section, the words of commencement were repealed by section 1 of, and Schedule 1 to, the Statute Law Revision Act 1948.

Section 3
This section was repealed by section 1 of, and the Schedule to, the Statute Law Revision Act 1871.

Section 5
This section, from "be it" to "enacted that" was repealed by section 1(1) of, and Part I of the Schedule to, the Statute Law Revision Act 1888.

Section 4
This section was repealed by section 1 of, and the Schedule to, the Statute Law Revision Act 1871.

Section 6
This section was repealed by section 1 of, and the Schedule to, the Statute Law Revision Act 1887.

References
Halsbury's Statutes,

Great Britain Acts of Parliament 1785
Fire prevention law